The ornate burrowing frog (Platyplectrum ornatum) is a species of ground frog native to Australia. It was moved to the genus Opisthodon in 2006, following a major revision of amphibians, and is now classified in the genus Platyplectrum.

Description

This frog is a relatively small and stubby species, growing no larger than 50 mm. It ranges in colour from grey to brown to yellow, and the dorsal surface patterns vary greatly between specimens. There is usually a butterfly-shaped patch behind the eyes. The dorsum is generally covered with red-tipped warts, and skin folds are present towards the head. The legs and arms are barred or spotted with darker markings. Toes have a slight webbing, while fingers have none.

It has the smallest genome known to any frog, and is even smaller than that of many birds. This is an adaptation to the desert environment where it lives. Because the ponds where they breed dries up fast in the desert, the tadpoles has to go through metamorphosis as fast as possible, which can occur just eleven days after the eggs were fertilized. A small genome gives small cells, and the smaller the cells are, the faster the tadpoles transform into small frogs and can escape the shrinking ponds.

Ecology and behaviour

This species distribution ranges from western Sydney to Cape York in Queensland, running along either side of the Great Dividing Range across to Western Australia. It occurs in both wet sclerophyll forest in coastal areas and in woodland in more arid regions. As its name suggest, this species of frog burrows. It burrows feet first, enlarged tubercles on the frogs feet help them in scraping out soil. This species is usually only seen after heavy rain during spring or summer. Males call while floating in still water bodies such as dams, puddles and flooded grassland. The call is a short, nasal "unk" repeated slowly.

Breeding

Breeding occurs only after heavy rain. Up to 1600 eggs are deposited in a small, dome shaped foam mass that soon collapses into a single floating film layer of eggs and jelly. Tadpoles reach 50mm but commonly only reach 36 mm in length. The dorsum is a dusky grey or brown. The side of the body has silver and/or gold flecking and the tail has grey-silver flecks.

Similar species

This species looks very similar to Spencer's burrowing frog, Platyplectrum spenceri and some Neobatrachus species. It is distinguished from all of these species by the reduced webbing and mating call.

References

Anstis, M. 2002. Tadpoles of South-eastern Australia. Reed New Holland: Sydney.
Barker, J.; Grigg, G.C.; Tyler, M.J. (1995). A Field Guide to Australian Frogs. Surrey Beatty & Sons.

Footnotes

Platyplectrum
Amphibians of Queensland
Amphibians of New South Wales
Amphibians of the Northern Territory
Amphibians of Western Australia
Amphibians described in 1842
Taxa named by John Edward Gray
Frogs of Australia